Reynier van Rooyen (born 25 April 1990) is a South African rugby union player for the  in the Currie Cup and in the Rugby Challenge. His regular position is scrum-half.

Career

He was one of 8 academy players that graduated to the first team for 2012 and was included in the squad for the 2012 Vodacom Cup.

He was named on the bench for the game against  on 30 March 2012, but made his debut on 30 July 2012 in the opening game of the 2012 Currie Cup First Division season against .

He was a member of the Pumas side that won the Vodacom Cup for the first time in 2015, beating  24–7 in the final. Van Rooyen made eight appearances during the season, scoring one try.

References

South African rugby union players
Eastern Province Elephants players
Pumas (Currie Cup) players
Living people
1990 births
Rugby union scrum-halves
People from Mbombela
Rugby union players from Mpumalanga